Will Ord is a UK-based educational trainer and speaker, specialised in Thinking Skills, Religious Education, and Citizenship Education. He is also the Chair of the Society for Advancing Philosophical Enquiry and Reflection in Education (SAPERE).

Ord advocates for education that promotes thinking and communication skills, reflective practice, and the 'community of learners' at the heart of learning and teaching.

Bibliography 

 'Action for Change' Don Rowe and Will Ord
 Citizenship in Action 1' Peter Norton, Sarah Edwards, Andy Griffith and Will Ord
 Citizenship in Action 1: Teacher's Resource Pack' Clare Ricketts, Will Ord, Sarah Edwards and Peter Norton
 Citizenship in Action 2: Teacher's Resource Pack' Will Ord, Peter Norton, Anne Riley and Andy Griffith
 '''Citizenship in Action 3: Teacher's Resource Pack' Peter Norton, Will Ord, Anne Riley and Clare Ricketts
 Themes in RE (Book 3)' Joe Jenkins and Will Ord
 Themes in RE: Learning from Religions Teachers Resource File 3' Joe Jenkins and Will Ord
 Developing Citizens'''

External links 
 www.thinkingeducation.co.uk
 www.Sapere.org.uk
 www.citizenshipfoundation.co.uk

References 

Living people
Year of birth missing (living people)